Hayom Shehaya (lit. The Day That Was) is an Israeli late night current events program, broadcast on Israeli TV's Channel 10.

The show has been on air since June 2003. It is aired every evening at the end of the prime time schedule, usually at 22:30 pm. It is broadcast live and  presented by Israeli radio and  media persona Guy Zohar. Sometimes Tali Moreno takes his place. Ze'ev Chasper edited the show from its inception with a break in 2007–2008 to serve as channel 10's website's manager. Hanoch Daum hosted the show that year.

Hayom Shehaya offers an alternative to the traditional news narrative through the introduction of personal commentary, irony and comic moments. Zohar also asks viewers to send in clips via cell phone, which he watches on a computer screen and comments on in real time.

See also
Television in Israel

References

2000s Israeli television series
2010s Israeli television series
2003 Israeli television series debuts
Israeli television news shows
Channel 10 (Israeli TV channel) original programming